The Lennart Nilsson Award recognizes outstanding contributions to scientific photography.  Honorees are chosen based on the merits of their efforts in
scientific imagery. It is administered by the foundation Stiftelsen Lennart Nilsson and awarded annually by Karolinska Institutet. The award sum is  SEK 100,000. The award was inaugurated in 1998 in honor of Swedish photographer and scientist Lennart Nilsson (1922–2017) .

Award recipients 
According to the society's published list of award recipients:
 Nils Åslund, Royal Institute of Technology (KTH), Stockholm - 1998
 James Henderson - 1999
 David Malin, Anglo-Australian Observatory  - 2000
 David Doubilet - 2001
 Oliver Meckes and Nicole Ottawa - 2002
 David Barlow, University of Southampton  - 2003
 Göran Scharmer, Institute for Solar Physics  - 2004
 Frans Lanting -  2005
 Satoshi Kuribayashi -2006
 Felice Frankel Harvard University and Massachusetts Institute of Technology  - 2007
 Anders Persson, Linköping University  - 2008
 Carolyn Porco, Space Science Institute and Babak Amin Tafreshi - 2009
 Kenneth Libbrecht, California Institute of Technology  - 2010
 Nancy Kedersha, Harvard Medical School -  2011
 Hans Blom, Royal Institute of Technology (KTH), Stockholm  - 2012
 Timothy Behrens, University of Oxford -2014
Katrin Willig, Max Planck Institute for Experimental Medicine in Göttingen, Germany - 2015
 Alexey Amunts, Stockholm University -2016 
Xiaowei Zhuang, Harvard University - 2017 
Thomas Deerinck, University of California, San Diego - 2018
 Ed Boyden, Massachusetts Institute of Technology -  2019

References

External links 
 Lennart Nilsson Award
 Past winners of the Lennart Nilsson Award

Photography awards
Swedish awards
Karolinska Institute
Awards established in 1998